German submarine U-557 was a Type VIIC U-boat built for Nazi Germany's Kriegsmarine for service during World War II. She was laid down on 6 January 1940, launched on 22 December 1940 and commissioned on 13 February 1941. Oberleutnant zur See Ottokar Arnold Paulssen was in command throughout her career. For her first three war patrols her 2nd Watch Officer was Herbert Werner, who later wrote the memoir of U-boat service, Iron Coffins.

She was rammed and sunk by mistake by an Italian torpedo boat on 16 December 1941 west of Crete.

Design
German Type VIIC submarines were preceded by the shorter Type VIIB submarines. U-557 had a displacement of  when at the surface and  while submerged. She had two shafts and two  propellers.

U-557 was fitted with five  torpedo tubes (four fitted at the bow and one at the stern), fourteen torpedoes, one  SK C/35 naval gun, 220 rounds, and a  C/30 anti-aircraft gun. The boat had a complement of between forty-four and sixty.

Service history

Emergency in the Baltic
U-557 commissioned on 13 February 1941, and was assigned to 1st U-boat flotilla, then based at Kiel. She spent the next four months at Königsberg, working up in the Baltic. During this period she suffered a diving accident, during which one crewman died. Werner describes this incident graphically in his book: He tells us that 
a routine dive in the Baltic turned into an emergency when the boat sank out of control. She hit the bottom stern-first with a thump. The depth gauge read ; the submarine was in severe difficulty, having taken on tons of water, poisonous chlorine gas was leaking from the batteries and there was the danger of an explosion. U-557 had also suffered her first death; a mechanic sustained fatal head injuries in the after torpedo room. A human chain of sailors was formed, passing buckets of sea water to each other, in an attempt to shift some of the weight from the stern to the bow. After many hour's toil, the boat pivoted so that the bow hit the bottom. But the sheer weight of water (about 40 tons) prevented U-557 from reaching the surface. The boat, having exhausted its supply of compressed air, stayed on the sea bed. The crew, under the direction of the Chief Engineer, rocked the boat by moving rapidly from stern to bow and back again. The submarine eventually worked herself free. After 20 hours, U-557 surfaced and sailed on to Kiel.

First patrol
U-557 departed from Kiel on 13 May 1941 to take up station in the Atlantic.
On 24 May her captain was directed to support the sortie by battleship  and join a five boat patrol line west of the French coast to form a trap for units of the British Home Fleet, which were in pursuit as Bismarck fled towards the French coast.

Despite their efforts the trap failed and Bismarck was attacked and sunk on 27 May. 
The Home Fleet had been able to track down and destroy Bismarck without hindrance from the U-boat Arm.

The trap was dissolved and U-557 was directed to join patrol line West, searching for North Atlantic convoys.
However the Bismarck operation had disrupted U-boat operations and only two ships sunk in latter two weeks of May; one of these was Empire Storm, sunk by U-557 on 29 May.

On 1 June U-557 re-fuelled from supply ship Belchen, but later that same day Belchen was caught and sunk by Royal Navy units engaged in hunting down the Operation Rheinübung supply train.

On 3 June U-557 joined Group West, but the group had no success; this period following the capture of U-110 and the consequent penetration of German Enigma code meant the Allies were able to re-route threatened convoys around areas of known U-boat activity and losses were kept to a minimum.

U 557 abandoned her patrol after six relatively fruitless weeks, arriving at Lorient on 10 July.

Second patrol
U-557 sailed on her second war patrol on 13 August 1941, though she returned two days later (reason unknown), sailing again on 20 August to take position south of Iceland. 
On 24 August U-557 found and reported convoy OS 4 and commenced shadowing. As reinforcements arrived, Paulssen was permitted to attack; he made three approaches, sinking four ships in total. Seven other U-boats joined the assault, but only one other had any success. U-557 continued to shadow, but had no further success, and on 28 August the attack was called off.
On 28 August U-557 joined the Bosemuller patrol line. 
On 2 September this was reconfigured into patrol line Seewolf.
Neither had any success and on 15 September U-557 was ordered to return, arriving at Lorient on 19 September.

Third patrol
On 19 November 1941 U-557 sailed from Lorient bound for the Mediterranean. 
Werner had been reassigned and had left the boat at this point.
On 25/26 November she successfully penetrated the Straits of Gibraltar, despite Allied ASW patrols, and on 2 December sank the freighter Fjord off Cape Estepona, Spain. This caused some controversy, as a subsequent investigation showed this attack had infringed Spanish neutrality, having taken place within Spanish territorial waters.
U-557 arrived at Messina on 7 December 1941.

Fourth patrol
On 9 December U-557 sailed again on her fourth and last patrol, into the eastern Mediterranean. Both submarines made attacks on the cruiser and she sank with the loss of more than half her crew. U-557 has been credited with the sinking. 
 
News of this sinking even reached the Submarine Tracking Room in London.

Fate
At 18:06 on 16 December, U-557 sent a short radio signal indicating that she was 18 hours from port. At 18:00 on the same day, the Italian torpedo boat Orione left the Cretan port of Suda. The commander had no knowledge that a German U-boat was in the area of Crete.

When the Italian commander saw a submarine at 21:44, heading in a northerly direction, he decided to ram it, supposing it to be British. U-557 sank immediately with all hands; the damaged Italian torpedo boat headed back to base.

An investigation by Supermarina (Italian Naval Command) determined the collision was an accident, though they reserved judgement on whether the ramming was intended, or the result of a navigational error. They also noted that German notification of U-557 presence in the area did not arrive with Supermarina until 22:00, after the incident had taken place.

Wolfpacks
U-557 took part in three wolfpacks, namely:
 West (25 May – 20 June 1941)
 Bosemüller (28 August – 2 September 1941)
 Seewolf (2 – 15 September 1941)

Summary of raiding history

References

Notes

Citations

Bibliography

 Clay Blair, Hitler's U-Boat War Vol I  (1996).  

Paul Kemp : U-Boats Destroyed ( 1997) . 
Axel Neistle : German U-Boat Losses during World War II (1998).  
Herbert Werner Iron Coffins (1969) Cassel & Co.

External links

World War II submarines of Germany
1940 ships
U-boats commissioned in 1941
Ships built in Hamburg
U-boats sunk in collisions
U-boats sunk in 1941
U-boats sunk by Italian warships
U-boat accidents
World War II shipwrecks in the Mediterranean Sea
German Type VIIC submarines
Maritime incidents in December 1941
Friendly fire incidents of World War II
Ships lost with all hands
Shipwrecks of Greece